Hussain Umarji was a cleric from the city of Godhra in the western Indian state of Gujarat accused of being the 'key conspirator' of a conspiracy which led to the arson of the Sabarmati Express at the Godhra railway station on 27 February 2002. He was later acquitted by the courts for lack of evidence.

Personal life
A graduate from Darul Uloom Deoband, Hussain was a prominent leader of the Deobandi-Tableegh Jamaat movement in the Godhra region.

Hussain was a prosperous timber merchant married to Shabira and had six children, two daughters Fatima and Afsa, and four sons, two of whom are Amin and Saeed.

References 

2013 deaths
Deobandis
Indian philanthropists
People from Panchmahal district
POTA detainees
Year of birth missing